Ekiben is a type of boxed meal, sold in Japan.

Ekiben may also refer to:
Ekiben (film), a 1999 Japanese mock documentary film on the adult video industry 
Ekiben (sexual act), where a person is carried by their partner during sex
Ekiben Hitoritabi, a Japanese manga series